Risellopsis is a genus of sea snails, marine gastropod mollusks in the family Littorinidae, the winkles or periwinkles.

Species
Species within the genus Risellopsis include:
 Risellopsis mutabilis May, 1909 
 Risellopsis varia (Hutton, 1873)

References

Littorinidae